Blennidus dianae is a species of ground beetle in the subfamily Pterostichinae.

References

Blennidus
Beetles described in 2006
Endemic fauna of Colombia